David J. Ball (30 March 1950 – 1 April 2015) was an English guitar player.

Career
In April 1971, he left Big Bertha and joined Procol Harum after he saw an advertisement in Melody Maker. He replaced Robin Trower, who had left the group to form his own band. He can be heard on the group's live album, Procol Harum Live with the Edmonton Symphony Orchestra, but left the group during the recording sessions for their 1973 album Grand Hotel, in September 1972.

He then formed the group Bedlam with his brother Dennis and drummer Cozy Powell, who released an album on Chrysalis Records, but the group disbanded after a brief period. He also recorded with Long John Baldry on Baldry's 1973 album Good to Be Alive. He also played in the Nickey Barclay Band in London in the 1980s. In 1988, while working in Oman, he performed in the band Rashid Goes To Nizwa.

For a time, he joined the Army.

He last played with Gary Brooker of Procol Harum in London, in July 2007. He also sometimes played with the Procol Harum tribute band, The Palers. In 2012 he released a solo album titled Don't Forget Your Alligator.

Ball died of bowel cancer on 1 April 2015 at the age of 65.

References

External links
ProcolHarum.com biography of Dave Ball

1950 births
2015 deaths
Procol Harum members
Musicians from Birmingham, West Midlands
Deaths from colorectal cancer
People from Handsworth, West Midlands